Étang de Soulcem is a large artificial lake in the Pyrenees mountains in Ariège, France. It is at an elevation of 1570 m and is used for hydroelectricity, generating 62 GWh/year. The lake, which has a surface area of 0.91 km2, was formed following the construction by Électricité de France of a dam across the northern end of the Vicdessos valley in 1980–1983.

The lake contains various fish including brown trout (S. trutta), Arctic char (S. alpinus), brook trout (S. fontinalis), and common minnow (P. phoxinus).

External links

Soulcem
Hydroelectric power stations in France
Dams completed in 1983